Bradford County is the name of two counties in the United States:

 Bradford County, Florida 
 Bradford County, Pennsylvania